Pandanus microcarpus is a species of plant in the family Pandanaceae, endemic to Mauritius.

Description
This small (5-6m), slender, freely branching tree can be distinguished from its closest relatives by its drooping, dark yellow-green leaves with red marginal spines.

It can also easily be distinguished by its small (7–9 cm), oval, red to purple fruit-head, which is born on a twisted, recurved stalk. Each fruit-head is packed with 75-200 2.5 cm-long drupes. The exposed top of each drupe is flat or slightly convex (not forming a domed or pyramid shape). Unusually for its genus, it sometimes bears staminodes.

Habitat
It is endemic to Mauritius, where it was once widespread. Its habitat is now largely destroyed. Its natural habitats are rivers and swamps in medium-rainfall areas of Mauritius.

References

microcarpus
Endemic flora of Mauritius
Critically endangered plants
Taxonomy articles created by Polbot
Taxa named by Isaac Bayley Balfour